Amy Louise Williams (born 28 February 1992) is an English weightlifter.

Early career
Williams started with CrossFit in 2014 at the age of 22. Later she change to Olympic weightlifting. Williams participated in her first competition in 2015.

Major results

References

External links

1992 births
Living people
English female weightlifters